Poorman Peak is a rock peak (1,610 m) near the head of Suvorov Glacier, 9 nautical miles (17 km) west-southwest of Mount Ellery, in the Wilson Hills. Mapped by United States Geological Survey (USGS) from surveys and U.S. Navy air photos, 1960–63. Named by Advisory Committee on Antarctic Names (US-ACAN) for Dean A. Poorman, ADJ1, U.S. Navy, Aviation Machinist's Mate with Squadron VX-6 at McMurdo Station, 1967.

Mountains of Oates Land